The Bavarian Class E I steam locomotives operated by the Royal Bavarian State Railways encompassed four different variants of saturated steam, goods train locomotive with a 2-8-0 wheel arrangement.

Standard variant, older type 

The first series of E I's was built by Krauss in 12 examples. The cylinders were positioned in front of the carrying axle and drove the first coupled axle. The carrying and driving axles were linked together in a Krauss-Helmholtz bogie. In addition the outside Walschaerts (Heusinger) valve gear had very short connecting rods on the engines delivered to Bavaria.

The vehicles were coupled with Bavarian Class bay 2'2' T 18 tenders. Later they were equipped with Class 3 T 12.3 tenders from the Bavarian B XI's.

Sondermann Variant 

The second E I series delivered to the Royal Bavarian State Railways was the Sondermann Variant built from 1896. It had two overlapping cylinders that formed a combined double slide valve (Doppelschieber). The carrying axle and the first driving axle were housed in a Krauss-Helmholtz bogie. The advantage of this locomotive variant was that the double cylinder was very short as a result of the tandem construction. Nevertheless, the engine did not perform especially well, so that the two units were converted into locomotives with a conventional cylinder arrangement.

Standard variant, newer type 

The third series of the E I locomotive was the final version of this particular class. A total of 48 vehicles were made and 42 were taken over by the Reichsbahn with the numbers 56 312 - 56 353. It was the same as the Sondermann variant after the conversion of the latter. These locomotives could haul a train of 820 tons at a speed of 50 km/h and even attained a speed of 40 km/h with a 1,390 ton train. On a line with a 0.5% incline they could manage an 845-ton train at 25 km/h.

Vauclain Variant 

The Class E I locomotives built for the Royal Bavarian State Railways by the Baldwin were goods train steam locomotives imported from the United States for testing purposes.

The two machines were the first in Germany to have a bar frame, which had been standard in the USA virtually from the beginning and which had been developed from the wooden beam frames of the early locomotives.

Like the two S 2/5 express train locomotives also imported from Baldwin a year later these engines were equipped with a four-cylinder Vauclain compound engine, on which the high-pressure and low-pressure cylinders were located directly one above the other and worked on the same connecting rods. Apart from the bar frame, this type of drive did not catch on in Bavaria.

The locomotives were equipped with Bavarian 2'2' T 18,1 tenders.

See also 
 Royal Bavarian State Railways
 List of Bavarian locomotives and railbuses

Sources 
 
 
 
 

2-8-0 locomotives
E I
Standard gauge locomotives of Germany
Krauss locomotives
Baldwin locomotives
Railway locomotives introduced in 1894
1′D n2 locomotives
1′D n4v locomotives
Vauclain compound locomotives
Freight locomotives